Butterfield Green is a hamlet north of Luton, in the Borough of Luton, in the ceremonial county of Bedfordshire, England. It is the location for the new  Butterfield Business and Technology Park.
When completed, the low density development will offer up to one million square feet of office space in a parkland setting.

One of the first buildings on the site is the Basepoint Business and Innovation Centre, which is starting to provide premises for many businesses. Butterfield is the location of the University of Bedfordshire's Healthcare Learning Centre. The UK's first Hilton Garden Inn hotel opened at Butterfield in July 2008.

References
Basepoint plc

Hamlets in Bedfordshire
Luton